The 1990 Maghreb Athletics Championships was the eleventh and final edition of the international athletics competition between the countries of the Maghreb. Morocco, Algeria and Tunisia were the competing nations. Organised by the Union des Fédérations d'Athlétisme du Maghreb Uni (Union of Athletics Federations of the United Maghreb), it took place in Algiers, Algeria around 27 July. A total of 40 athletics events were contested, 22 for men and 18 for women. Morocco topped the medal table, followed by Algeria.

A women's 10,000 metres and 5000 metres walk were contested for the first time.

Medal summary

Men

Women

References

Champions
Les championnats maghrebins d athletisme. Union Sportive Oudja. Retrieved on 2015-02-20.

Maghreb Athletics Championships
International athletics competitions hosted by Algeria
Sport in Algiers
Maghreb Athletics Championships
Maghreb Athletics Championships
20th century in Algiers